Pamela Sue Anderson (April 16, 1955 – March 12, 2017) was an American philosopher who specialized in philosophy of religion, feminist philosophy and continental philosophy.

In 2007 she was an Official Fellow, Tutor in Philosophy and Christian Ethics, Dean, and Women's Advisor of Regent's Park College in the University of Oxford. Her former students include feminist philosopher Hanneke Canters.

Born in Hennepin County, Minnesota, Anderson was educated at Yale University and Mansfield College, Oxford and was formerly Reader in Philosophy at the University of Sunderland. Pamela taught at University of Oxford, where she was working on In Dialogue with Michèle Le Doeuff, translated works of Le Doeuff.

In 2009, she received an honorary degree from the University of Lund in Sweden.

She died of cancer six weeks before her 62nd birthday, having been ill for two years.

On 17 March 2018 Regent's Park College unveiled a portrait commissioned of Anderson, in recognition of both her academic contributions and her pastoral commitment to the college.

Selected works
Books
 (2010) Kant and Theology. with Jordan Bell. T&T Clark.
 (2006) Revisioning Gender in Philosophy of Religion: the Ethics and Epistemology of Belief. Ashgate.
 (2004) Feminist Philosophy of Religion: Critical readings. Editor with Beverley Clack. Routledge.
 (1998) A Feminist Philosophy of Religion: The rationality and myths of religious belief. Blackwell.
 (1993) Ricoeur and Kant: Philosophy of the will. Scholars Press.
Edited Books
 (2012) New Topics in Feminist Philosophy of Religion: Contestations and Transcendence Incarnate. Springer Netherlands.
Articles
 Anderson, Pamela S. "Postmodern Theology." Ed. Chad Meister and Paul Copan. The Routledge Companion to Philosophy of Religion. 2nd ed. New York: Routledge, 2013. 569–80. Print.

References

1955 births
2017 deaths
Deaths from cancer in England
Academics of the University of Sunderland
English women philosophers
Christian philosophers
Feminist philosophers
Philosophers of religion
Yale University alumni
Alumni of Mansfield College, Oxford
Fellows of Regent's Park College, Oxford
Continental philosophers
Postmodern feminists
Proponents of Christian feminism
20th-century American philosophers
21st-century American philosophers
People from Hennepin County, Minnesota
Place of death missing
20th-century English women
20th-century English people
21st-century English women
21st-century English people